Michel Trinquier (born 12 October 1931, in Avignon) is a French painter.

Biography 
He starts painting in studying after school at "collège Saint Jean-Baptiste de La Salle in Avignon and becomes member of the "Groupe de l'Atelier".
He is also found of paleontology.

In the 1960s he discovers Belle-Ile, an island in the Atlantic ocean and he starts to work through "collages" including sand, ropes or shellfish in his paintings.

In 1961 he receives the "Grand prix de peinture du festival d'art dramatique d'Avignon"  for a painting now in musée Calvet in Avignon.

Main exhibitions 
1973 : Galerie Barbizon, rue des Saint-Pères in Paris
1973 : Galerie Transposition, boulevard Raspail in Paris
1987 : Salon international d'art contemporain in Toulouse
1992 : Galerie Bonias in L'Isle-sur-Sorgue
1993 : fondation Vasarely in château de Gordes
1995 : Galerie Vincente Beneat in Barcelona
2017 : Palais des évêques de Bourg-Saint-Andéol 
2021 : Atelier-galerie Valérie Gautier, Sauzon

Books
Michel Trinquier has illustrated a poetry book together with Eugène Baboulène, Pierre Cayol, Hervé Di Rosa and Pierre François
, les 81 poèmes de Claude Garcia-Forner, Rayon Bleu

Notes and references 

1931 births
Living people
20th-century French painters
20th-century French male artists
21st-century French painters
French male painters
Modern painters